The Suranaree University of Technology ((SUT) is in Nakhon Ratchasima Province, Thailand. The university was established on 27 July 1990, becoming fully operational in 1993. 

It is named after Thao Suranari, the local heroine of Nakhon Ratchasima. It is one of nine National Research Universities of Thailand.

Suranaree University of Technology has employed the trimester credit system since 1993 for more efficient use of time, and to avoid the semester systemus summer session that usually is only half of the regular term in duration. The trimester system also enables students to take advantage of the cooperative education and career experience, so that they have sufficient time in the work site. 

The university houses the Synchrotron Light Research Institute (SLRI), formerly the National Synchrotron Research Center (NSRC) that enables advanced research on physics, materials science, and related areas.

History
During the period of the Fifth National Economic and Social Development Plan, the Royal Thai Government wished that more opportunities in higher education be available in the regional and rural areas. Thus, in 1984, the Ministry of University Affairs (now the Office of the Higher Education Commission, a part of the Ministry of Education) proposed the establishment of five new regional universities: one in each of the North, South, and East; and two in the Northeast. In particular, the Ministry proposed colleges affiliated with Khon Kaen University at Ubon Ratchathani and another in Nakhon Ratchasima, both in the Northeast. The college at Nakhon Ratchasima was to be called Suranaree College, and was built on 1,120 hectares of degraded forest area near the Huay Ban Yang Reservoir, Muang Nakhon Ratchasima District, Nakhon Ratchasima Province.

27 July 1990, King Bhumibol Adulyadej signed the Suranaree University of Technology Founding Bill, effective July 30, 1990.

Organization and academics
Suranaree University of Technology has grown to offer Undergraduate, Graduate and Post-doctoral among the eight (8) institutes that strongly reflect the university's academe. All Undergraduate, Graduate and Post-doctoral programs of Suranaree University of Technology have international program offering among its extensive curriculum.

Educational management

Center for Education Services
The Center for Education Services (abbreviated as CES) is the office of the university that handles student applications through the steps detailed.  The education center was established with Suranaree University of Technology under the university's operations. Under the Suranaree University of Technology Act B.E. 2533 (1990), his majesty the king has signed the university act. on July 27, 1990, and announced in the gazette, effective July 30, 1990.

Admissions
 Round 1 Portfolio
 Round 2 Quota
 Round 3 Admission 1
 Round 4 Admission 2
 Round 5 Direct Admission
 Apply for Scholarships
 Transfer from Other  Universities
 Re-Entry

Trimester System
Trimester 1   August - November                                                         
Trimester 2  November - February                                                              
Trimester 3  March - June

International programs
Suranaree University of Technology offers international programs at the Institute of Social Technology, Institute of Engineering, and Institute of Agricultural Technology.

The university offers scholarships and students aids for students who wish to apply the international programs. Most notable is the Royal Scholarship offered to young and deserving ASEAN students.

Centers of excellences and research organizations

The university's centeres of excellences were set up to develop and strengthen faculty and researcher capacity, to increase research productivity in line with the direction of university research. The following are the university leading "centers of excellences":
 High Energy Physics and Astrophysics
 Agricultural Product Innovation
 Advanced Functional Materials
 Biomass
 Innovation for Sustainable Infrastructure Development
 Electromagnetic Wave Application
 Biomechanics Medicine
 Microbial Technology (for Agricultural Industry)
 Technology and Innovation (for Korat Chicken Business Development)
 Entrepreneurship

The university also houses several industry research organizations. 
 Synchrotron Light Research Institute - established to develop the Siam Photon Source and Siam Photon Laboratory 
 Regional Observatory for the Public, Nakhon Ratchasima - is one of the 5 ROPs in Thailand focused on astronomical learning.

Campus 
Suranaree University of Technology has developed the campus as a Residential University by developing learning centers within the student dormitory area and other areas that serve students efficiently and effectively. The university formulated a 10-year university development strategy for 2012-21 to support and create a positive and suitable environment for living within the university (Happy and Healthy Environment), strengthening and developing the university into Residential University, as well as developing dormitories as living and learning dormitory.

The university began construction of six student dormitories since fiscal year 1993, supporting first-generation undergraduate students. the number of undergraduate and postgraduate students increased in construction until the 2005 academic year. The dormitory is not enough to accommodate all students, and the differences in lifestyle in both study and maturity of postgraduate and undergraduate students are provided by the university, so all dormitories are provided to undergraduate students (from S1-S20), while postgraduate and postgraduate students are provided to stay at the Surasamanakkan Building.

International collaboration 
In 2020, SUT has collaborated with various international bodies and international institutions under agreements since1992. Presently SUT’s collaborative network has extended worldwide to 99 institutions. Furthermore, SUT signed MOUs with 16 institutions

National Cooperation

SUT values its cooperation, collaboration and activities with organizations and bodies in Thailand.

in 2020, SUT signed 17 Memorandas of Agreement.

 Collaboration with Global Power Synergy PCL one research project and the development of a solar energy system
 Collaboration with Council of Science and Technology Professionals in the development of science and technology professional occupations
 Academic collaboration with Rajamangala University of Technology Isan Khonkaen Campus
 Academic collaboration with Big Tech Innovation Co., Ltd. and JSP Pharmaceutical Manufacturing (Thailand) PLC
 Academic collaboration with Rajamangala University of Technology Phra Nakhon
 Academic collaboration with JOBBKK Dot Com Recruitment Co., Ltd. in cooperative education management
 Academic collaboration with CPF Food Research & Development Center Co., Ltd.
 Academic collaboration with Gro Green Solutions Co., Ltd.
 Collaboration with Eiam Thongchai Industry Co., Ltd. in research and development
 Collaboration with Agricultural Research Development Agency (Public Organization) in research promotion
 Academic collaboration with AIDA Medical Co., Ltd. and The Foundation of Research and Education for Public
 Academic collaboration with Alpha Import Export (Thailand) Co., LTD.
 Academic collaboration with Surin Sugar Group Co., Ltd.
 Research collaboration with PS Nutrition Co., Ltd. in Food Technology and Related Fields for development of functional chicken meat
 Academic collaboration with Hitachi Consumer Products (Thailand) Co., Ltd.
 Academic collaboration: 4 research studies (Institute of Dentistry)

Rankings

Notes

References

Buildings and structures in Nakhon Ratchasima
Universities in Thailand
Educational institutions established in 1990
1990 establishments in Thailand